is a retro-styled platforming video game by Sega for WiiWare. It is produced by Phantasy Star Universe producer Takao Miyoshi, and was released in Japan on February 3, 2009.

Pole's Big Adventure features an 8-bit style presentation and gameplay reminiscent of NES and Sega Master System platform games. However, the game also pokes fun at the conventions of these games (particularly Super Mario Bros.), featuring a crude sense of humor and frequent references to the fourth wall.

Plot
The game involves Pole, a cowboy, rescuing his girlfriend Sharon from a kidnapper. At the end of each level Pole "rescues" Sharon, only to find she is a poorly-disguised enemy character.

Gameplay
Pole's Big Adventure features traditional side-scrolling platforming gameplay, with Pole killing enemies with a shotgun that can be upgraded, as well as tackling several bosses. Although there are six levels, the main objective of the game is for the player to stumble across the many gags hidden in the game. Each gag is highlighted for the player through on screen text and voice over from an announcer.

The game features 100 gags for the player to uncover, with some only available on a second playthrough. One gag involves the player collecting a power-up mushroom, only to become so giant that they die and lose a life. Another power-up gives Pole an erection. The game also features deliberate bugs and glitches such as slowdown and graphical corruption, while other gags spoof platforming game conventions such as the player being forced to control a limping Pole after he breaks his leg landing from a high platform.

References

External links 
Official Japanese website
Images at IGN

2009 video games
Japan-exclusive video games
Platform games
Retro-style video games
Sega video games
WiiWare games
Wii-only games
Wii games
Video games developed in Japan